1941: Counter Attack is a  vertical scrolling shooter arcade game by Capcom, released in February 1990. It is the prequel to 1942, and the third game in the 19XX series. It was ported to the SuperGrafx in 1991 and to GameTap. It was released on Capcom Classics Collection Remixed for the PlayStation Portable and Capcom Classics Collection Vol. 2 for PlayStation 2 and Xbox. It was followed by 19XX: The War Against Destiny in 1996.

Gameplay 

The goal is to shoot down enemy airplanes and collect weapon power-ups (POW). The game uses a vitality system instead of life system in which if the player is hit, it loses one point of vitality and the player is destroyed if hit with 0 vitality then the player is given the option to continue. Lightning attacks can be used by pressing the B button which sacrifices a portion of life energy. Three loops can be performed per level and a bonus is awarded at the end of the level for unused loops. Player 1 uses a P-38 Lightning and Player 2 uses a new plane: DH.98 Mosquito. The game shifts from the original Pacific Front setting with that of the Western Front, in the north Atlantic Ocean.

It is the first shoot 'em up to add +1 to the score when a continue is used.

Release 
1941: Counter Attack was first released in arcades by Capcom and Electrocoin in 1990, running on the CP System board. In February 2021, it was re-released in pack 2 of the Capcom Arcade Stadium compilation for Nintendo Switch.

Reception 

In Japan, Game Machine listed 1941: Counter Attack in its March 15, 1990 issue as the third most popular arcade game of the month. The game garnered positive reception from reviewers and awards from Gamest magazine. However, the original arcade version had mixed reception from western publications. In contrast, the SuperGrafx conversion had very positive reception from Japanese and western critics. Readers of PC Engine Fan voted to give the SuperGrafx version a 19.44 out of 30 score, ranking at the number 368 spot in a poll.

Notes

References

External links 
 1941: Counter Attack at GameFAQs
 1941: Counter Attack at Giant Bomb
 1941: Counter Attack at Killer List of Videogames
 1941: Counter Attack at MobyGames

1990 video games
Anti-war video games
Arcade video games
Capcom games
CP System games
SuperGrafx games
Vertically scrolling shooters
Video games set in 1941
Video games developed in Japan
World War II video games